Lühhike öppetus (Estonian for Brief Instruction), by modern orthography 'Lühike õpetus', was the first periodical publication in the Estonian language.  Edited by Dr. Peter Ernst Wilde and printed for a short while in 1766–1767, it described various simple medical techniques intended to be usable in the field by peasants.

The full title of the newspaper was Lühhike öppetus mis sees moned head rohhud täeda antakse, ni hästi innimeste kui ka veiste haigusse ning viggaduste vasto, and it can be translated as Brief instruction announcing some good medicine, both for human and bovine ailments and traumas.  It was printed weekly, with each issue having four pages.  A total of 41 issues were printed.

August Wilhelm Hupel was responsible for translating the content to Estonian language.

Classification 
Lühhike öppetus did not deal with news; thus, it is not universally classified as a newspaper — despite its format.  Various sources refer to it as a magazine, a journal, or even a book published in 41 volumes.  The first regular Estonian language publication unequivocally considered a newspaper, the Tarto maa rahva Näddali-Leht, appeared in 1807.

See also 
 Estophilia

References 

 Estonian National Library: Rare Book Collection
 Aino Valmet: „Lühhike öppetus“ keelelisest küljest — Keel ja Kirjandus, 1966, issue 11, pages 683–688
 Helgi Vihma: Eesti esimese teadusliku sõnaraamatu eelkäijast – Kodumurre, 1972, issue 10/11, pages 53–55
 Veel A. W. Hupeli osast esimeses eestikeelses ajakirjas. Läbi kahe sajandi, compiled by Juhan Peegel. Tallinn, 1971, pages 7–10
 H. Normann: Märkusi esimesest Eesti arstilis-tervishoiulisest ajakirjast. – Eesti Arst, 1926, issue 12, pages 428–432.
 Bartlett, Roger. (April 1, 2006) The Slavonic and East European Review. German popular enlightenment in the Russian empire: Peter Ernst Wilde and Catherine II. Volume 84; Issue 2; Page 256.

Publications established in 1766
1767 disestablishments
18th century in Estonia
Publishing
Medical manuals
Estonian literature